Tracy Steele (born December 18, 1963) is a Democratic former member of the Arkansas House of Representatives, having most recently represented the 39th District, with service from 2011 to 2013.

Personal life
Tracy Steele's hometown is in North Little Rock. He is a Baptist.  Steele and his wife Cassandra have two children.

Education
Steele received his education at:
Bachelor's, Political Science, Rice University in Houston, Texas
Steele played on the Rice Owls men's basketball team.
And completed Governor's School at Duke University.

Politics
He served in the Arkansas State Senate in which he was both Majority Leader and Majority Whip. He served in the Arkansas House from 1998 to 2002 for the 59th District.

Political Experience
Steele has had the following political experience:
Representative, Arkansas State House of Representatives, 1998–2002, 2011-2013
Senator, Arkansas State Senate, 2002-2010
Assistant Pro Tempore, Arkansas State Senate, 2009-2010
Majority Leader, Arkansas State Senate, 2006-2010

External links
Arkansas State Legislature - Senator Tracy Steele official government website
Project Vote Smart - Senator Tracy Steele (AR) profile
Follow the Money - Tracy Steele
2008 2006 2004 2002 State Senate campaign contributions
2000 State House campaign contributions

References

1953 births
Living people
Democratic Party Arkansas state senators
African-American state legislators in Arkansas
Democratic Party members of the Arkansas House of Representatives
Baptists from Arkansas
Politicians from North Little Rock, Arkansas
Rice Owls men's basketball players
Sportspeople from Little Rock, Arkansas
American men's basketball players
20th-century African-American people
21st-century African-American politicians
21st-century American politicians